The Sinister Urge may refer to:

 The Sinister Urge (film), a film by Edward D. Wood Jr.
 The Sinister Urge (album), an album by Rob Zombie